is a 360-year-old pine forest in Karatsu, Saga. It has a width of 400 - 700 metres, a length of about 4 km, and a total area of 240 hectares.

The forest was originally planted by the feudal lord Terazawa Hirotaka as a counter-measure against the strong winds and tides in Karatsu Bay.  Today it is a popular tourist spot, and on a list of the 100 most beautiful places in Japan.

This forest is easily accessible from both Karatsu City and Fukuoka City, by the Chikuhi Line.  There are several hotels and places to park nearby.

See also
List of Special Places of Scenic Beauty, Special Historic Sites and Special Natural Monuments

External links
 Yokatoko 

Forests of Japan
Special Places of Scenic Beauty
Geography of Saga Prefecture
Tourist attractions in Saga Prefecture